The Minister for the Maison du Roi was a cabinet role under the French monarchy, conferring leadership of the Maison du Roi.

Ancien Régime 

Under the Ancien Régime the ministerial post at the head of the Maison du Roi was a Secrétaire d'État à la Maison du Roi (Secretary of State of the Maison du Roi).

1570-1789 
 1570–1579 : Simon Fizes, baron de Sauves 
 1579–1588 : Villeroy Brulard
 1579–1588 : Claude Pinard, seigneur de Comblisy et de Cramailles
 1588–1613 : Martin Ruzé, Seigneur de Beaulieu 
 1588–1594 : Louis de Revol
 1606–1638 : Antoine de Loménie 
 1615–1643 : Henri Auguste de Loménie, sieur de Brienne 
 1643–1669 : Henri du Plessis-Guénégaud, sieur du Plessis-Belleville 
 1669–1683 : Jean-Baptiste Colbert, également contrôleur général des finances 
 1672–1690 : Jean-Baptiste Colbert, marquis de Seignelay 
 1690–1699 : Louis Phélypeaux (1643-1727), comte de Pontchartrain 
 1693–1715 : Jérôme Phélypeaux, comte de Pontchartrain 
 1715–1718 : Louis Phélypeaux, marquis de La Vrillière 
 1718–1749 : Jean Frédéric Phélypeaux, marquis de Maurepas 
 1749–1775 : Louis Phélypeaux, marquis de La Vrillière, comte de Saint-Florentin
 1775–1776 : Chrétien-Guillaume de Lamoignon de Malesherbes 
 1776–1783 : Antoine-Jean Amelot de Chaillou 
 1783–1787 : Louis Auguste Le Tonnelier de Breteuil
 1788–1789 : Pierre-Charles Laurent de Villedeuil

Constitutional monarchy 

19 July 1789 – 25 January 1791 : François-Emmanuel Guignard, comte de Saint-Priest.

Bourbon Restoration 

29 May 1814 – 20 March 1815 : Pierre Jean Casimir, duc de Blacas d'Aulps
1 November 1820 –  4 August 1824 : Jacques Alexandre Law de Lauriston
4 August 1824 –  4 January 1828 : Ambroise-Polycarpe de La Rochefoucauld, duc de Doudeauville.

July Monarchy 
Louis-Philippe of France had no household and thus there was no minister for the Maison du Roi under the July Monarchy. However, there was an intendant général of the civil list, who was not a member of the government.

 10 October 1830 – 2 November 1830 : Camille de Montalivet (provisional intendant of crown grants)
 2 November 1830 – 10 October 1832 : Agathon Jean François Fain
 10 October 1832 – 22 February 1836 : Camille de Montalivet
 22 February 1836 – 6 September 1836 : Agathon Jean François Fain
 6 September 1836 – 15 April 1837 : Camille de Montalivet
 15 April 1837 – 31 March 1839 : Pierre-Marie Taillepied de Bondy
 31 March 1839 –  2 February 1848 : Camille de Montalivet

Second Empire 

14 December 1852 – 23 November 1860 : Achille Fould
4 December 1860 – 10 August 1870 : Jean-Baptiste Philibert Vaillant

Maison du Roi
Bourbon Restoration